The Stornoway Free Presbyterian Church, is a place of worship of the Free Presbyterian Church of Scotland in Stornoway. The church was built in 1895.

Churches completed in 1895
Churches in the Outer Hebrides
Buildings and structures in the Isle of Lewis
Free Presbyterian Church of Scotland